This is a list of the highest known prices paid for philatelic items, including stamps and covers. The current record price for a single stamp is US$9,480,000 paid for the British Guiana 1c magenta.

Where necessary, the price is first converted to dollars using the exchange rate at the time the item was sold. The inflation adjustment may change as recent inflation rates are often revised. A list in another currency may be in a slightly different order due to exchange-rate fluctuations. Individual items are listed only once, i.e. for the highest price sold.

 Buyer's premium included

See also

Notes

References

Philatelic items
Auction-related lists